John Miles Otway (1 April 1793 – 1 April 1872) was an English first-class cricketer who played two matches in the 1820s, in both cases representing the Gentlemen against the Players, totalling 25 runs with a highest score of 13 not out. His brother was William Otway.

References

Bibliography
 

English cricketers
English cricketers of 1787 to 1825
Gentlemen cricketers
1793 births
1872 deaths